PalaItalia Santa Giulia is a projected Milan venue for the Milano Cortina 2026. It will accommodate 15,000 spectators. After 2026 it will be used as a multi-purpose venue.

See also
Mediolanum Forum

References

Indoor ice hockey venues in Italy
Indoor arenas in Italy
Sports venues in Lombardy